Secret Service is a Swedish pop band formed in Stockholm in 1979.

History 
In 1979, Ola Håkansson, former vocalist of Ola & the Janglers and then a publishing manager at Sonet Records, teamed up with Tim Norell and Ulf Wahlberg as Ola+3 to perform at the 1979 Melodifestivalen, a contest which is the Swedish qualification to the Eurovision Song Contest. Ola+3 did not win but the members decided to continue working together and recorded an LP as Ola+3. Besides Ola Håkansson (vocals), Tim Norell and Ulf Wahlberg (keyboards), the original lineup also included Tonny Lindberg (guitars), Leif Paulsen (bass) and Leif Johansson (drums). Norell, who along with lyricist Björn Håkanson penned most songs of the band, did not however appear with them on stage or on the band photos. 

Song number two on that swedish LP-release "Oh Susie (Bara vi två vet)" was released as a single with english lyrics and they changed their band's name to Secret Service. "Oh Susie" became number 1 in Sweden and after Radio Luxembourg played the song it was emerging in different countries worldwide, including South America and Australia. In Germany alone it sold a million units, and Wahlberg stated in 2017 that "Oh Susie" went to number 1 in 29 countries.
Their follow-up single, "Ten O'Clock Postman", also went gold in Sweden and became a top 5 single both in Germany and Japan.

Following the success of the soca-tinged single "Ye-Si-Ca" in Columbia, the band went to a two-week promotional tour of the South American continent.

Secret Service brought in new synthesizers into their sound, they had the first LinnDrum-machine that had just arrived in Sweden, and more successes followed, with their synthpop single "Flash in the Night" released in December 1981 hitting charts all over continental Europe. In May 1982 Secret Service released their third album Cutting Corners and their first Greatest Hits album was also released before Christmas. 

With the album Jupiter Sign released in 1984, showed a new direction for the band moving on from synthesizers to the use of new technologhy like sampled sounds and sequenced beats. Ola Håkansson also took over writing the lyrics as his alias Oson.

Continuing with the album When the Night Closes In and the single "Night City" helped launch the sound of the Hi-NRG movement. When the Night Closes In was also the last album recorded with the original line up. Jonas Frick directed a 18-minute promotional video featuring 6 of the songs.

In 1986 Ola Håkansson released a duet with ex-ABBA's Agnetha Fältskog, "The Way You Are", which went gold in Sweden. In 1987 Håkansson, Norell and Wahlberg released Aux Deux Magots, their last album as Secret Service. New members were multi-instrumentalist Anders Hansson and bassist Mats A. Lindberg. Håkansson lost interest to be the singer and the front man, and would become Norell's partner with Army of Lovers' Alexander Bard in what would be known as the Megatrio, a Swedish equivalent to Stock-Aitken-Waterman known as Norell Oson Bard.

In 1992, Håkansson and his associates established Stockholm Records as a joint venture with PolyGram. 

In 2012, Secret Service released The Lost Box, an album with forgotten and unreleased recorded songs from the 1980s and early 1990s, such as "Different" and "Satellites".

Norell, Wahlberg, Hansson and Lindberg had begun to tour with a new singer, Johan Becker, as Secret Service, mostly in Russia. They also released a single, Secret Mission in 2020. On 18 November 2022, a new album with new material was released.

Personnel 

Current members
 Tim Norell – vocals, keyboards (1979–present)
 Ulf Wahlberg – vocals, keyboards (1979–present)
 Anders Hansson – bass, keyboards (1986–present)
 Mats A. Lindberg – bass (1987–present)
 Jamie Borger – drums (2006–present)
 Jan-Erik Perning – drums (2006–present)
 Johan Becker – vocals, guitars (2018–present)

Former members
 Ola Håkansson – vocals (1979–2000)
 Tonny Lindberg – guitars (1979–1986)
 Leif Johansson – drums (1979–1986)
 Leif Paulsén – bass (1979–1986)
 Mikael Erlandsson – vocals, guitars (2006–2018)

Timeline

Discography

Albums

Studio albums

Compilation albums

Singles

References

External links
 

Swedish new wave musical groups
Swedish pop music groups
Musical groups established in 1979
Attic Records (Canada) artists
Castlebar Song Contest winners